The Colony Club is a women-only private social club in New York City. Founded in 1903 by Florence Jaffray Harriman, wife of J. Borden Harriman, as the first social club established in New York City by and for women, it was modeled on similar clubs for men. Today, men are admitted as guests.

History

Original clubhouse 
With other wealthy women, including Anne Tracy Morgan (a daughter of J.P. Morgan), Harriman raised $500,000, and commissioned Stanford White of McKim, Mead & White to build the original clubhouse, later known as the "Old Colony Club". This building – at 120 Madison Avenue, between East 30th and East 31st Streets on the west side of Madison – was built between 1904 and 1908 and was modelled on eighteenth-century houses in Annapolis, Maryland.

The interiors, which exist largely unchanged and have been accorded the landmark status, were created by Elsie de Wolfe – later to become Lady Mendl – a former actress who had recently opened an interior-design business, and whose companion, the theatrical agent Elisabeth Marbury, was one of the club's founders.  Stanford White was slain by Harry K. Thaw months before construction of the Colony Club was completed.  The building was designed in the Federal Revival style, and has unusual brickwork done in a diaper pattern as a notable feature of its facade.

The club and the street in front of it were often the site of large suffrage rallies sponsored by the Equal Franchise Society to which many members of the Club belonged.

The Old Colony Club was sold to Genevieve Garvan Brady after the club moved to its new location in 1916. Today, the building houses the East Coast headquarters of the American Academy of Dramatic Arts. It was awarded landmark status by the City of New York in 1966.

Second clubhouse

The second clubhouse, located at 564 Park Avenue, also known as 51 East 62nd Street, on the northwest corner, was commissioned in 1913 and constructed from 1914 to 1916. It was designed by Delano & Aldrich in the Neo-Georgian style, with interiors designed by Elsie de Wolfe The building has a marble base with red-brick and marble trim and columns for the upper floors. According to Andrew Dolkart:

In 1973, Secretary of State Henry Kissinger's birthday party was held at the Colony Club (among the guests were four couples whom Kissinger had ordered to be wiretapped). In 2007, memorial services for Brooke Astor were held there. The club continues its policy of women-only membership – new members must be recommended by current members — although it was unsuccessfully contested in court in 1987 by conservative radio talk-show host Bob Grant and Sidney Siller, who founded the National Organization for Men.

The Club presently has approximately 2,500 members who have access to discussions, concerts, and wellness and athletic programs. The Clubhouse consists of seven stories, 25 guest bedrooms, three dining rooms, two ballrooms, a lounge, a squash court, an indoor pool, a fitness facility and three personal spa service rooms. Annual gross revenues are more than $10 million.

Notable members 
 Madeleine Talmage Force Astor – wife of John Jacob Astor IV
 Ambassador Robin Chandler Duke
 Florence Jaffray Harriman – founder
 Jessica Garretson Finch, college president, founding member.
 Elisabeth Marbury
 Kathleen Troia  McFarland
 Anne Morgan – a daughter of J. P. Morgan, and a founding member
 Frances Louisa Tracy Morgan – wife of J. P. Morgan
 Judith Peabody
 Emily K. Rafferty, former president Metropolitan Museum of Art
 Abby Aldrich Rockefeller
 Julia Catlin Park Taufflieb – the first American woman to receive the Légion d'honneur in World War I for turning her chateau in northern France into a 300-bed hospital
 Anne Harriman Vanderbilt, founding member
 Ava Lowle Willing – founding member

See also
List of American gentlemen's clubs
The Colony, a former restaurant near the Colony Club, sharing many of the same patrons

References
Notes

Bibliography
Medina, Miriam. "Full list of members in first year" The New York Times (April 17, 1908)

External links

 Documenting the Gilded Age: New York City Exhibitions at the Turn of the 20th Century. A New York Art Resources Consortium project. Exhibition catalogs from the Colony Club.

Clubs and societies in New York City
Clubhouses in Manhattan
Women's clubs in the United States
Gentlemen's clubs in the United States
Buildings and structures completed in 1908
Cultural infrastructure completed in 1916
Clubhouses on the National Register of Historic Places in Manhattan
Clubs and societies in the United States
New York City Designated Landmarks in Manhattan
History of women in New York City
1903 establishments in New York City
Delano & Aldrich buildings
McKim, Mead & White buildings
Colonial Revival architecture in New York City
Women in New York City
Women's club buildings in New York (state)